Centauro is a 2022 action thriller film directed by Daniel Calparsoro consisting of a remake of the Yann Gozlan's 2017 film Burn Out. It stars Àlex Monner, Begoña Vargas, Carlos Bardem, Patricia Vico and Édgar Vittorino.

Plot 
Seeking to settle a debt, wannabe pro biker Rafa decides to pledge his services to a criminal organization. However, he is torn between the two lives he is leading as an honest man in the morning and a courier at night. Eventually this double life takes a toll on him and he resorts to drugs, which affects his dream of being a pro racer. At last he understands that there is no way out from the crime life and with help of his friend he tries to escape the drug cartel but is identified by the police and offered the same job just on the side of law which he takes up as he realises that family is the most important thing.

Cast

Production 
A remake of the Yann Gozlan's film Burn Out, the screenplay was penned by Gaël Nouaille and Gemma Ventura. The film was produced by Borsalino Productions, with the collaboration of the Catalunya Film Commission,  and Film Lonelylands. It was shot in the Spanish provinces of Barcelona and Teruel.

Release 
The film was released on Netflix on 15 June 2022.

Reception 
Raquel Hernández Luján of HobbyConsolas rated the "simple and efficient" film 70 out of 100 points ("good"), citing the "unstoppable" pace of the narration, the chase sequences and the ending among the best things about it, while drawing out "superfluous additions" detracting from the story, such as the street dance scene, as the worst elements of the film.

References 

2022 action thriller films
Remakes of French films
Remakes of Belgian films
Films shot in Aragon
Films shot in Catalonia
Spanish-language Netflix original films